Sorsogon Diversion Road, also known as Salvador H. Escudero III Diversion Road, is a , national secondary road in the city of Sorsogon of the Sorsogon province in the Philippines.

The entire road is designated as National Route 643 (N643) of the Philippine highway network.

Route description
Like most of the diversion roads in the country, the road bypasses the city proper of Sorsogon as an alternate route of Maharlika Highway, which goes straight to the city proper.

Notable buildings
 Sorsogon City Government Center

Intersections

References

Sorsogon City
Roads in Sorsogon